Mount McCallum is a peak rising to about  immediately northwest of the  Mount Marwick, in the Explorers Range of the Bowers Mountains in Antarctica. Following a proposal by M.G. Laird, leader of a New Zealand Antarctic Research Programme geological party to the area, 1981–82, the mountain was named after New Zealand scientist and mountaineer G. McCallum, who worked in Antarctica in the 1963–64 season, and who perished in an avalanche on Mount Ruapehu, New Zealand, in 1981.

References

Mountains of Victoria Land
Pennell Coast